Buellia gypsyensis is a species of crustose lichen in the family Caliciaceae. Found in the Falkland Islands, it was described as a new species in 2019 by British lichenologist Alan Fryday. The type was collected from Gypsy Cove near Port Stanley in East Falkland, where it was found growing on a north-facing rock; it is named for its type locality. The main distinguishing characteristics of the lichen are its filiform (threadlike) conidia and the presence of 5-O-methylhiascic acid as the major secondary chemical in the thallus.

In 2020, Buellia gypsyensis was assessed as a vulnerable species for the global IUCN Red List.

See also
List of Buellia species

References

gypsyensis
Lichen species
Lichens described in 2019
Lichens of the subantarctic islands
Fungi of the Falkland Islands